Euphaedra fucora, the Oban blue forester, is a butterfly in the family Nymphalidae. The habitat consists of forests.

Adults feed on fallen fruit.

References

Butterflies described in 1979
fucora